Lotuko may refer to:
the Lotuko people
the Lotuko language